The Huntington News is the independent student-run and operated newspaper of Northeastern University, a private research institution in Boston, Massachusetts.

History
Founded in 1926, The Northeastern News was Northeastern University's student newspaper.  As a recognized student group, The Northeastern News reached a weekly circulation of 10,000.  The newspaper had been fiscally self-sufficient for years and in 2008, it was announced that The Northeastern News would go independent and become a registered 501(c)3 non-profit corporation, in the process changing their name to The Huntington News.

In 2016, the newspaper announced a fundraising campaign to clear a $30,000 debt, and to place the publication on a firmer financial footing.

References

Student newspapers published in Massachusetts
Publications established in 1926
1926 establishments in Massachusetts